Thirumalai Kovil is a Murugan temple situated at Panpoli,  Sengottai in the Tenkasi district of Tamil Nadu, South India. It is about 100 km from Thiruvananthapuram.  The temple is situated on a small hill surrounded by the Western Ghats near the border with Kerala.

Vaippu Sthalam
It is one of the shrines of the Vaippu Sthalams sung by Tamil Saivite Nayanar.

Description
The lord Murugan in this temples shrine is called  'Thirumalai kumarasamy' or 'Thirumalai murugan'. This temple is the nakshatra temple of people born under Vishaka star. Because of the lords name most of the people in this region have the name 'thirumalai'.  There is one more goddess temple within this temple, called 'Thirumalai Kaali amman'. This hill temple is surrounded by many coconut plantations and small villages.

Until recently, the only way for devotees to reach the temple was by walking. The temple is also famous for its large number of steps(624). Recently, a road was constructed which enables people to go by two and four wheelers until the temple at the top.

The temple is located in a small place called Panpozhi which is located at a distance of around 100 km from Thiruvananthapuram. The nearest town in Tenkasi which is 20 km away.

Festival
Thai Pusam Festival is the important annual festival celebrated in the Tamil month of Thai (January and February).

References

Hindu temples in Tenkasi district
Murugan temples in Tamil Nadu